Nathaniel Rateliff & the Night Sweats is the debut studio album by Nathaniel Rateliff & the Night Sweats, released by Stax on August 21, 2015.

Critical reception

Nathaniel Rateliff & the Night Sweats garnered generally positive reception from music critics. At Metacritic, they assign a "weighted average" score to selected independent ratings and reviews, and based upon twelve reviews, the album has a Metascore of 73 meaning that it received "generally favorable" reviews. At Rolling Stone, Chuck Arnold rated the album three stars out of five, stating that "Rateliff hasn't completely forgotten his folkie past: The wistful "Wasting Time" shows that he can still kill you softly." Thom Jurek of AllMusic rated the album three-and-a-half stars out of five, writing that "Rateliff's world-weary, deeply expressive tenor and lyrics place him on a different level than any of the current crew of revivalists." At The Guardian, Harriet Gibsone rated the album three stars out of five, stating that "Aside from Snake [sic], which brings to mind Paolo Nutini slumped at the back of a strip club, the album is full of the ghosts of songwriting greats like Otis Redding, Chuck Berry and Van Morrison, and sounds like it should establish Rateliff as the breakneck bar brawler of the new soul movement."

Track listing

Personnel

 Derek Banach – group member
 Rick Benjamin – group member
 Leah Concialdi – group member
 Eric D. Johnson – group member
 Nick Krier – group member
 Matt Marshall – A&R
 Patrick Meese – engineer, group member, horn engineer
 The Night Sweats – primary artist
 Russ Pahl – group member
 Emily Philpott – package design
 Joseph Pope III – bass
 Nathaniel Rateliff – composer, group member, primary artist
 Rett Rogers – photography
 Starett Rogers – group member
 Glenn Ross – band photo
 Adam Shaffner – group member
 Mark Shusterman – group member
 Richard Swift – engineer, group member, mixing, producer
 TW Walsh – mastering
 Wesley Watkins – group member
 Andreas Wild – group member

Charts

Weekly charts

Year-end charts

Certifications

References

2015 debut albums
Nathaniel Rateliff albums
Stax Records albums
Concord Records albums
Albums produced by Richard Swift (singer-songwriter)